Hastings and Macleay was an electoral district of the Legislative Assembly in the Australian state of New South Wales from 1894 to 1920. It was created with the division of the two-member electorate of Hastings and Manning. In 1920 proportional representation was introduced and Hastings and Macleay was absorbed into the new four-member district of Oxley. The electorate was named after the Hastings and Macleay Rivers, the alluvial valleys of which contained most of its population.

Members for Hastings and Macleay

Election results

References

Former electoral districts of New South Wales
1894 establishments in Australia
Constituencies established in 1894
1920 disestablishments in Australia
Constituencies disestablished in 1920